The 2011–12 season will be Oțelul Galați's 20th consecutive season in the Liga I, and their 23rd overall season in the top-flight of Romanian football. This season will be the first in their history in which they take part of the UEFA Champions League.

Overview
The previous season of Liga I ended on May 21 and the players went on vacation. The players are set to return to training on June 10.

Players

Squad information

Transfers

In

Out

Player statistics

Squad statistics

Start formations

Disciplinary records

Suspensions

Club

Coaching staff

Kit

|
|

Competitions

Overall

{|class="wikitable" style="text-align: center;"
|-
!
!Total
! Home 
! Away
! Neutral
|-
|align=left| Games played || 44 || 23 || 20 || 1
|-
|align=left| Games won  || 18 || 10 || 7 || 1
|-
|align=left| Games drawn|| 7 || 6 || 1 || –
|-
|align=left| Games lost || 19 || 7 || 12 || –
|-
|align=left| Biggest win|| 3–0 vs Voința Sibiu || 3–0 vs Voința Sibiu || 2–0 vs Ceahlăul || 1–0 vs Steaua
|-
|align=left| Biggest loss || 0–4 vs CFR Cluj || 0–4 vs CFR Cluj || 0–2 vs Man Utd || –
|-
|align=left| Clean sheets || 17 || 11 || 5 || 1
|-
|align=left| Goals scored || 45 || 26 || 18 || 1
|-
|align=left| Goals conceded|| 45 || 22 || 23 || 0
|-
|align=left| Goal difference || 0 || +4 || -5 || +1
|-
|-
|-
|align=left| Yellow cards   || 118 || 57 || 57 || 4
|-
|align=left| Red cards      || 9 || 4 || 5 || –
|-
|align=left| Most appearances || colspan=4|  Antal (40)
|-
|align=left| Most minutes played ||colspan=4|  Râpă (3,541)
|-
|align=left| Top scorer     || colspan=4|  Didi (8)
|-
|align=left| Top assister   || colspan=4|  Antal (6)
|-
|align=left| Points         || 62/132 (%) || 36/69(%) || 22/60(%) || 3/3(100%)
|-
|align=left| Winning rate   || % || % || % || 100%
|-

Liga I

League table

Results summary

Results by round

Points by opponent

Source: FCO

Matches
Kickoff times are in EET.

UEFA Champions League

Group stage

Cupa României

Supercupa României

Friendlies

Netherlands training camp

Others

Cyprus training camp

Spain training camp

Turkey training camp

See also
FC Oțelul Galați
2011–12 Liga I
2011–12 Cupa României
2011–12 UEFA Champions League

References

External links
2011–12 FC Oțelul Galați season at Soccerway

2011-12
Otelul Galati season
Otelul Galati